Trichotomoxia is a genus of beetles in the family Mordellidae, containing the following species:

 Trichotomoxia chubbi Franciscolo, 1950
 Trichotomoxia demarzi Ermisch, 1962
 Trichotomoxia grosseantennalis Franciscolo, 1955

References

Mordellidae